Valery Limasov (born 6 December 1955) is a Russian boxer. He competed in the men's light welterweight event at the 1976 Summer Olympics.

References

External links
 

1955 births
Living people
Russian male boxers
Olympic boxers of the Soviet Union
Boxers at the 1976 Summer Olympics
Sportspeople from Ufa
Light-welterweight boxers